Richard Raši (born 2 April 1971) is a Slovak physician and politician who served as Slovakia's Deputy Prime Minister for Investments and Information. A member of the Voice – Social Democracy political party, Raši previously served as Mayor of the city of Košice. He also served from 3 June 2008 until 8 June 2010 as Minister of Health in the First cabinet of Robert Fico.

Early life and education 
Born 2 April 1971 in Kosice, Raši studied medicine at the Medical faculty at the University of Pavol Jozef Šafárik from 1989, receiving his medical degree in 1995. After specializing as a trauma surgeon he received his master's degree in the field of public health at the Slovak Medical University in 2004, six years later he received his PhD degree in the same field at Technical University of Košice.

Career 
Immediately after graduation, he started work as a trauma surgeon intern at the University Hospital of L. Pasteur in Kosice. By 2004, he had been promoted to Vice-director of that hospitals clinic of traumatology. From 2007 he worked as the head of the Bratislava Faculty Hospital, until 2008, when he was appointed Minister of Health.  In between the years, Rasi spent several mFromonths on internships abroad, working in the United States, Sweden and Switzerland among others.

Minister of Health 
Raši was appointed as Minister of Health on 3 June 2008, by president Ivan Gasparovic. This happened the same day as his predecessor Ivan Valentovič resigned. Valentovič had long been under severe pressure to resign over his handling of the controversial health insurance reform as well as the general state of the Slovak health system. His relationship with the president had been strained, and in the end, it was speculated that the prime minister Robert Fico had in fact fired him, although this was denied by Fico.

After Raši assumed the post, he inherited a department under heavy public scrutiny, and was criticized for his lack of political experience. Opposition MP Viliam Novotny from the Slovak Democratic and Christian Union – Democratic Party called him a "puppet in the hands of Fico and Paska", referring to prime minister Fico, and the speaker of parliament Pavol Paska, both senior figures within the Smer-SD party.

During Raši's two-year tenure as minister he set out on continuing his predecessors attempt to reform the country's health insurance sector.  He also launched a campaign of aggressive legislation aimed at improving the public health. One example being increasing taxes on products with high amounts of sugar, or otherwise unhealthy products.

Member of Parliament 
While serving as government minister of health, he also stood as Smer-SD's candidate for a parliamentary seat in the 2010 Slovak parliamentary election from his native district of Kosice. In a fortunate turn of events, he ended up gaining the seat, although losing the ministers post due to Smer-SD losing the election. He was reelected to a full four-year term in the 2012 Slovak parliamentary election.

Mayor of Košice 
In September 2009, it was announced that Smer-SD would place Raši on the party's ticket for the upcoming mayoral election in Kosice. This was despite the fact that they in April had confirmed that another politician, Ladislav Lazar would be the party's choice.  However, the increasingly popular Raši had since eclipsed Lazar. Prime Minister Robert Fico confirmed his choice of Raši saying that "We are looking for strong candidates that can win elections, therefore we are giving people from the executive branch a chance".

In what was to be the closest election in Kosice in over 20 years, Raši eventually won with 36% of the vote, 4 percent ahead of the runner-up, incumbent mayor František Knapík who received 32%. The turnout however, was surprisingly low, at 33%.

He resigned as Mayor on 26 March 2018 after being appointed Deputy Prime Minister. He was succeeded by Deputy Mayor Martin Petruško in an acting capacity.

Deputy Prime Minister 
Raši was appointed Deputy Prime Minister for Investments and Information upon the ascension of Peter Pellegrini to the office of Prime Minister in March 2018. He was approved, along with the rest of the new Cabinet, by the National Council on 26 March 2018.

Personal life 
Raši lives in Košice with his wife and three daughters. He enjoys hiking as well as sports.

References 

|-

|-

Living people
1971 births
Politicians from Košice
Direction – Social Democracy politicians
Health ministers of Slovakia
Slovak surgeons
Members of the National Council (Slovakia) 2010-2012
Members of the National Council (Slovakia) 2012-2016
Members of the National Council (Slovakia) 2016-2020
Members of the National Council (Slovakia) 2020-present